The WM Motor (Weltmeister) EX5 is a battery electric compact crossover SUV that is manufactured by the Chinese NEV manufacturer WM Motor (Chinese: 威马汽车) under the brand Weltmeister. The model was first announced in December 2017 and unveiled to the public in May 2018 at the Beijing Auto Show. Mass production of the EX5 began in September 2018.

Overview

The WM Motor EX5 production version made its debut at the 2018 Beijing Auto Show. The price of the EX5 ranges from CNY￥139,800 (~US$20,000) to CNY￥189,800 (~US$27,100), inclusive of Chinese government electric vehicle subsidies.

There are three variants of the EX5, the EX5 400 Mate, EX5 400 and EX5 520. The EX5 400 Mate and EX5 400 are both equipped with a  battery that provides  NEDC range. The EX5 520 is equipped with a  battery and achieves  NEDC range.

WM Motor supplies a 6.6 kW, 220V home charger that can fully charge the EX5 in 8.5 to 9 hours. Charging from 30% to 80% takes 30 minutes when using 120 kW DC fast chargers.

The EX5 is built around three core technologies – the 'Living Motion' electric powertrain, the 'Living Pilot' intelligent driving assistance system, with L2 ADAS autonomous driving features, as well as the 'Living Engine operating system, which offers smart connectivity and interactive features in the cabin.

On 28 September 2018, one year from the start of the production of the EX5, the company announced that it had delivered over 16,000 EX5s, with the model maintaining a customer satisfaction score of 97%.

Core Technology

 Living Pilot – Driving assistance and autonomous driving features 
Since Q2 2019, the EX5 can be equipped with a full suite of Bosch L2 ADAS features, making the EX5 the first model in its category that delivers the full suite of L2 ADAS features. The Living Pilot L2 ADAS features are enabled through one high-definition front camera, three medium distance millimeter wave radars, a 360-degree camera system consisting of 4 cameras mounted around the vehicle, and 12 ultrasonic radar sensors. In January, 2019, WM Motor announced a long-term strategic partnership with Baidu to jointly develop L3 and L4 autonomous driving technologies, and establish the 'WM Motor & Baidu Apollo Intelligent Vehicle Joint Research Center'.

 Living Engine - Smart Connectivity and Interactive Features 
WM Motor's Living Engine is powered by the company's own operating system, which integrates software applications and technologies. The Living Engine consists of proprietary features as well as third-party applications developed by WM Motor's partners including Tencent (QQ Music for music streaming; WeChat for instant messaging), Baidu (Baidu Maps for navigation), iQiyi (video streaming platform) as well as Xiaomi and Gree Electric (smart home appliances). Through the use of facial recognition technology, Living Engine can automatically consolidate the driver's online music and video streaming and social media accounts to the vehicle. Living Engine deploys a 12.8 inch rotating touch screen display which functions as the main user interface for the infotainment and environmental control systems as well as a 12.3 inch interactive LCD instrument display.

Living Engine is also integrated with an onboard virtual assistant, 'Xiaowei' (Chinese: 小威)that uses voice recognition technology to respond to commands from the driver and passengers.

 Living Motion - E-Powertrain 
WM Motor's Living Motion E-powertrain consists of an electric drive module, battery pack and electronic control insulated-gate bipolar transistor (IGBT). Living Motion uses components from suppliers including BorgWarner (electric drive module), Infineon (electronic control IGBT), as well as CATL (宁德时代), Tianjin Lishen (天津力神) and Tafel (塔菲尔新能源科技) (lithium-ion battery cells and modules). The BMS also helps to prevent battery degradation, with the EX5 having been shown to experience only 5% degradation after  of real world driving.

 Safety 
In July 2019, the EX5 was certified with C-NCAP 5-star safety rating.

 Battery 
The EX5's battery pack is positioned at the center of the car and has an ingress protection rating of IP67, meaning that the battery is 100% protected against dust, sand and other outside elements.L2 ADAS'

WM Motor has, together with its partners, developed an intelligent driving assistance system for the EX5 that incorporates a range of safety features, including Adaptive Cruise Control (ACCA), Intersection Collision Avoidance (ICA), Traffic Jam Assist (TJA) and Automatic Parking Assist (APA), as well as eight further security features. WM Motor releases quarterly OTA updates aimed at improving its L2 systems.

References

External links

Compact sport utility vehicles
Crossover sport utility vehicles
Production electric cars
Cars introduced in 2017
Cars of China